Annett Hesselbarth (born 4 June 1966 in Halle) is a retired German sprinter who specialized in the 400 metres.

At the 1990 European Championships in Athletics in Split she finished fourth in 400 m and won the 4x400 m relay for East Germany together with Grit Breuer, Manuela Derr and Petra Schersing. At the 1991 IAAF World Indoor Championships in Seville Hesselbarth helped win the gold medal in an indoor world record time of 3:27.22 minutes. The teammates were Sandra Seuser, Katrin Schreiter and Grit Breuer. At the 1991 World Championships in Athletics she ran in the heats for the German team who finished third in the final.

Achievements

Note: At the 1991 World Championships, Hesselbarth ran in the 4 x400m heats, but not the final.

References

1966 births
Living people
Sportspeople from Halle (Saale)
People from Bezirk Halle
German female sprinters
European Athletics Championships medalists
World Athletics Indoor Championships winners
20th-century German women